Bethlehem is a German extreme metal band from Grevenbroich, formed in 1991 by Jürgen Bartsch and Klaus Matton. Before starting Bethlehem, Bartsch and Matton used to play in a German thrash metal band Morbid Vision. Many of their lyrics revolve around sickness, morbidity, suicide, death and madness, and may to some extent be personal to the band.

History
Bethlehem was formed by Jürgen Bartsch in 1991. They recorded a few demos in the early 90s before releasing their debut album Dark Metal in 1994, which featured Andreas Classen on vocals. On their second full-length album Dictius Te Necare (Latin: You must/should kill yourself), Classen was replaced with Rainer Landfermann on vocals (known as the bass player in the German death metal band Pavor). Landfermann's vocals were particularly extreme, described by critics and fans alike as "one of the sickest and most extreme voices you'll ever hear from a human being". On S.U.I.Z.I.D. his place is taken by Marco Kehren from the band Deinonychus. Guido Meyer de Voltaire, the vocalist from Schatten aus der Alexander Welt and Mein Weg, is also well known with his band Aardvarks. Andreas Classen, vocalist on Dark Metal also did vocals for Shining (primary vocalist Niklas Kvarforth also provided vocals for Bethlehem on the album A Sacrificial Offering to the Kingdom of Heaven in a Cracked Dog's Ear), Dark Creation, Paragon Belial, Made of Iron, Kadathorn, and Darkened Nocturn Slaughtercult. Over the years Bethlehem modernized their style and so the early black and doom metal influences are now hardly present, the band favouring a more Neue Deutsche Härte (New German Hardness) and electronic approach. In 1998 Bethlehem collaborated on the soundtrack for the American underground movie Gummo with the tracks "Schuld Uns'res Knöcherigen Faltpferds" and "Verschleierte Irreligiösität".

Members

Current members
 Jürgen Bartsch: guitars, electronics, synthesizers (Mein Weg), bass guitar
 Yvonne "Onielar" Wilczynska: vocals
 Ilya Karzov: guitars
 Florian "Torturer" Klein: drums

Former members and cooperations
 Rainer Landfermann: vocals (on Dictius Te Necare and Alles Tot)
 Jonathan Théry: vocals
 Reuben Jordan: guitars
 Guido Meyer de Voltaire: vocals (on Schatten aus der Alexanderwelt, Mein Weg and Hexakosioihexekontahexaphobia)
 Andreas Tekath: Session-keyboards/piano (on Mein Weg)
 Klaus Matton: electric guitars (until Profane Fetmilch Lenzt Elf Krank)
 Marco Kehren: vocals (on S.U.i.Z.i.D.; Reflektionen aufs Sterben)
 Markus Lossen: drums (on S.U.i.Z.i.D.; Reflektionen aufs Sterben)
 Cathrin Campen: vocals (on S.U.i.Z.i.D.; Reflektionen aufs Sterben)
 Steinhoff: drums (until S.U.i.Z.i.D.)
 Andreas Classen: vocals (until Dictius Te Necare)
 Oliver Schmidt: session keyboards (on Thy Pale Dominion)
 Reiner Tiedemann: electronics (Schatten aus der Alexanderwelt), remixes (Suicide Radio)
 Niklas Kvarforth: vocals (on A Sacrificial Offering to the Kingdom of Heaven in a Cracked Dog's Ear and Stönkfitzchen)
 Steve Wolz: drums
 Olaf Eckhardt: guitars

Discography

Albums 
 Dark Metal (1994)
 Dictius Te Necare (1996)
 Sardonischer Untergang im Zeichen irreligiöser Darbietung (1998)
 Schatten aus der Alexander Welt (2001)
 Mein Weg (2004)
 A Sacrificial Offering to the Kingdom of Heaven in a Cracked Dog's Ear (2009)
 Hexakosioihexekontahexaphobia (2014)
 Bethlehem (2016)
 Lebe Dich Leer (2019)

EPs 
 Reflektionen auf's Sterben (EP, 1998)
 Profane Fetmilch Lenzt Elf Krank (EP, 1999)
 Suicide Radio (EP, 2003)
 Alles Tot (EP, 2004)
 Stönkfitzchen (EP, 2010)

Splits 
 Wraithen / Bethlehem (Split, 2002)
 Gestern Starb Ich Schon Heute / Have a Nice Fight (Split, 2009)
 Suizidal-Ovipare Todessehnsucht (Split, 2009)

Demos 
 Bethlehem (Demo, 1992)	
 Thy Pale Dominion (Demo, 1993)

Other publications and cooperations
 "Deathophobia I", Force Productions (1993)
 "Requiem", Exhumer Productions (1993)
 "Nuclear Blast Soundcheck Series – Volume 8", Nuclear Blast (1996)
 "Gummo (Soundtrack)" (1997)
 "Metal Explosion Volume 8", Adipocere Records (1998)
 "To Live Is Ever To Be In Danger", Red Stream (1999)
 "Upon A Mighty Bloodred Stream Volume 1", Red Stream (1999)
 "To Magic...", Prophecy (2000)
 "Legacy 04/01", Legacy (2001)
 "To Magic 2", Prophecy (2001)

References

External links 
 
 

German black metal musical groups
German doom metal musical groups
Musical groups established in 1991
Musical quartets
1991 establishments in Germany